Brissus agassizii is a species of sea urchins of the family Brissidae. Their armour is covered with spines. Brissus agassizii was first scientifically described in 1885 by Döderlein.

References 

Animals described in 1885
agassizii